Onslow St Audrey's School is a co-educational secondary school and sixth form situated in Hatfield, Hertfordshire in England. It specialises in business and enterprise, and is one of only two schools nationally to be awarded British Red Cross School status. Around 550 students attend Onslow St Audrey's with around 3 in the Seventh form. It caters for pupils aged 11 to 18.

Sixth Form 
The sixth form is  made up of approximately 100 students, spread across two-year groups. A friendly, communal atmosphere is present. Although the Sixth Form block, which contains a Study Room and a Common Room, is based away from the central school building, all lessons take place in the main school buildings. The Sixth Form is part of the 16 to 19 Welwyn & Hatfield Consortium and as such offers a wide range of A-Level subjects. Within the school and in the consortium with other Welwyn and Hatfield schools. A-Levels in Mathematics, English, History, Catering and Hospitality, Art, Music, Business, ICT, Science applied, Biology, Psychology, Childcare, Photography, Public Services and Sport are offered, as well as a range of other BTECs. Monitored broadband access is available, along with limited kitchen facilities, disabled access and toilets and their own Sixth form block to study and spend their break and lunch in if they please.

School performance
Its most recent Ofsted inspection report deeming it to be "good with a number of outstanding features." Results have improved dramatically year-on-year, and the most recent contextual value-added measure places it third in Hertfordshire.

The 2009 Ofsted inspection report judged care, guidance and support to be outstanding, wrote of "students' pride in and enjoyment of their school", and deemed attainment and achievement to be good. Ofsted judged overall leadership and management to be good and the leadership of the Headteacher, Paul Meredith, to be outstanding.

References

 2009 Ofsted Inspection Report   prepared 1 June 2009.
  2006 Ofsted Inspection Report   prepared July 2006.
 The Annual Report of Her Majesty's Chief Inspector of Schools  prepared 8 February 2000.

External links
 Official Website

Academies in Hertfordshire
Secondary schools in Hertfordshire